The Fiji men's national tennis team represents Fiji in the Davis Cup a team tennis event run by the International Tennis Federation (ITF) and is governed by the Fiji Tennis Association. They have not competed since 2001.

History
Fiji competed in its first Davis Cup in 1999. Their best result was fifth in Group IV in 1999 and 2000. Fiji started competing as part of the Pacific Oceania team. However they have not competed since 2001.

Last team (2001) 

 Sanjeev Tikaram
 Valu Fa
 David O'Connor
 Ajay Raniga

See also

Fiji Fed Cup team

References

External links

δ Fiji
Davis Cup
Davis Cup